Juan Moreira may refer to:

 Juan Moreira, a historic Argentine outlaw
 Juan Moreira (novel), an 1879 Argentine novel by Eduardo Gutiérrez
 Juan Moreira (1913 film), a silent Argentine film directed by Mario Gallo 
 Juan Moreira (1936 film), an Argentine film directed by Nelo Cosimi 
 Juan Moreira (1948 film), an Argentine film directed by Luis Moglia Barth
 Juan Moreira (1973 film), an Argentine film directed by Leonardo Favio

See also
Juan Morera (1947–2006), Spanish handball player